Motiur Rahman Mollik (1950 – 2010) was a poet lyricist, compositor, writer, organizer, researcher, editor, singer and a cultural leader. He was one of the modern poets of Bengali literature.

Biography
He is often called the poet of Renaissance and is remembered after the name of Kazi Nazrul Islam, the national poet of Bangladesh. His surviving works include articles consists of around two thousand songs, four poetry books, two lyrical and one juvenile books. Some of his works have been translated in many languages and some have been included in the text books for the young learners.

Life
Motiur Rahman Mollik was born at the village Baruipara under Bagherhat Sadar Thana of Bagherhat District. Thai village is adjacent to the memorable Shat Gambuj Mosque of great Khan Jahan Ali.  He was the last child of the three sons and two daughters. Mollik was the youngest child of late Munshi Kayem Uddin Mollik. His mother was Asia Khatun. Eldest brother Janab Ahmed Ali. Mollik is a renowned teacher Poet. Poet Motiur Rahman was named as Abdul Matin by his father. Respectable teacher from chowmuhuny Maulana Abdur Rab who was also a teacher of internationally famous Alem-E-Din Maulana Delwar Hossain Sayedee made a conversion from Abdul Matin to Motiur Rahman to sweeten his name. At the age of 34, he married Sabina Yesmin, with whom he had two daughters: Jummy Nahdia and Nazmy Natia, and one son: Hassan Munhamanna.

Education
Motiur Rahman Mollik started his education life at Barui Para Siddikia senior Madrasah. Then he studied at lawri Madsasah, Jessore, Khulna alia Madrasah, Bagerhat P.C. College and  Department of Bangla, Jagannath College (Now Jagannath University), Dhaka.

Works
Between 1980 and 1990, he became a prominent poet and singer, and gave birth of many successful organizations, one of which is Saimum Shilpi Goshthi, a famous cultural organization of Bangladesh. In addition, he worked for some of the well known monthly magazines e.g. Kolom, weekly newspaper Shonar Bangla and daily newspaper Shongram. He was working as the executive director of Bangladesh Shangskreetic Kendro at the time of his death.
 Abortito Trinolota,
 Rongin Megher Palki,
 Onoboroto Brikhkher Gaan,
 Nishonno Nirer Pakhi
are his poetry books. His lyrical paperbacks are
 Jhonkaar and
 Joto Gaan Geyechi.
Nirbachito Probondho is a collection of his articles.

Awards
Motiur Rahman Mollik was awarded by many organizations. Among them Shobuj Mitali Shongo Literature award, National Literature Gold Medal, Kolom Shena award, Baitush Sharaf award, International Mother Language Day Literature award (France), Bangla Shahitto Songskriti Shongshod award, Kishorkontho Literature award, Bangla Shahitto Porishod award etc.

References

1950 births
2010 deaths
Bangladeshi male poets
20th-century Bangladeshi poets
20th-century male writers
Jagannath University alumni